Damiete Charles Granville (born 1988) is a Nigerian model and beauty pageant titleholder who was crowned MBGN Universe 2012 and represented Nigeria in the 2012 Miss World pageant. She is also a former Miss Fresh Africa 2009.

Most Beautiful Girl in Nigeria 2012
Competing as Miss Rivers, Damiete placed in 1st runner-up at MGBN 2012 title at the grand finale held at the Best Western Hotel in Benin City, Edo State on Saturday, 5th May 2012.

References

External links
Official Most Beautiful Girl in Nigeria website

1988 births
Living people
Beauty pageant contestants from Rivers State
Nigerian beauty pageant winners
Miss World 2012 delegates
Nigerian beauty pageant contestants
Nigerian female adult models